Pinhal Interior Sul is a former subregion in the Centro region of Portugal. It was abolished at the January 2015 NUTS 3 revision. Its main town was Sertã.

Municipalities

References

Former NUTS 3 statistical regions of Portugal